Jericho is the eighth studio album by Canadian-American rock group the Band. Coming seventeen years after their "farewell concert", it was released in 1993 and was the first album to feature the latter-day configuration of the group, as well as their first release for the Rhino subsidiary Pyramid Records.

Joining original members Levon Helm (drums/mandolin/guitar/vocal), Rick Danko (bass/guitar/vocal) and Garth Hudson (organ/keyboards/horns) were Jim Weider (who had played guitar for the group from the time of their 1983 reformation), Randy Ciarlante (who had joined on drums in 1990) and Richard Bell (who had joined as keyboardist in 1991). There were an additional fourteen guest musicians. Having so many guests would be commonplace on the latter-day group's albums.

Recording
In 1985, the Band went into the studio for the first time since 1977 with the intent of recording tracks for an eventual album. Richard Manuel had recently expressed interest in writing new material for the group, and had written "Breaking New Ground" with Gerry Goffin and Carole King. However, on March 6, 1986, Manuel was found dead of suicide, and the Band abandoned efforts to make an album for several years.

In 1990, Sony offered the Band a recording contract. The group hired fellow Hawks member Stan Szelest to replace Manuel on keyboards, and proceeded to record new material with songwriter Jules Shear. However, these recordings were rejected by Sony, which suggested the group take submissions from various songwriters. Just as recording continued, Szelest died of a heart attack. The Band then requested release from Sony and found a new contract with Great Pyramid Records. Without Manuel or Robbie Robertson as songwriters, the group relied mostly on outside sources, such as Muddy Waters, Willie Dixon, Bruce Springsteen, and their friends Bob Dylan and Artie Traum. A few sessions also involved Champion Jack Dupree. "Country Boy", a song from the 1985 sessions with Manuel on vocals, was also selected for inclusion on the album. John Simon, who had produced the Band's first two albums, was again brought in to produce along with Aaron L. Hurwitz (engineer, record producer), to form the collection which would ultimately become Jericho. The album was finally completed in 1993, with new members Richard Bell, Randy Ciarlante and Jim Weider on keyboards, second drums and lead guitar respectively.

Cover
The album cover is a painting by Peter Max of the "Big Pink" house in West Saugerties, New York, where Bob Dylan and the Band recorded music during the mid to late 1960s. The albums The Basement Tapes and Music from Big Pink both originated from the music created in this house. The painting depicts the same view of the house used in the photographs on the cover of Music from Big Pink.

Reception

Mark Deming of AllMusic gave the album 3.5 stars out of 5. He wrote that while Robertson's strong songwriting and stinging lead guitar were sorely missed, the remaining musicians and guests performed well and Jericho "did unexpectedly prove that the Band could function very well without Robertson". Rolling Stone called their version of "Atlantic City" a "clear highlight".
"Stuff You Gotta Watch" was included in the 1994 film Little Big League.

Track listing

Personnel
The Band
Rick Danko – bass guitar, guitars, fiddle, trombone, keyboards, vocals
Levon Helm – drums, percussion, mandolin, guitar, vocals
Garth Hudson – organ, keyboards, accordion, electric piano, saxophones, synthesizers, horns
Richard Manuel – piano, keyboards, and vocals on "Country Boy"
Randy Ciarlante – drums, percussion, backing vocals
Rick Bell – keyboards, organ, piano, accordion, backing vocals
Jim Weider – guitars, backing vocals
Stan Szelest – electric piano on "Atlantic City" and "Blind Willie McTell"

Guest musicians
John Simon – electric piano, horns, saxophones
Champion Jack Dupree – piano on "Blind Willie McTell"
Vassar Clements – fiddle on "The Caves of Jericho" and "Stuff You Gotta Watch"
Eric Bazilian – mandolin on "Atlantic City"
Rob Hyman – keyboards on "Atlantic City"
Steve Jordan – drums on "Blues Stay Away from Me"
Jules Shear – backing vocals on "Too Soon Gone"
Tommy Spurlock – steel guitar on "The Caves of Jericho"
Artie Traum – acoustic guitar on "Amazon (River of Dreams)"
Colin Linden – backing vocals on "Amazon (River of Dreams)"
Bobby Strickland – tenor and baritone saxophones on "Remedy" and "Stuff You Gotta Watch"
Dave Douglas – trumpet on "Remedy" and "Stuff You Gotta Watch"
Rob Leon – bass guitar on "Too Soon Gone", "Amazon" and "The Caves of Jericho"

Production
The Band – producers
Aaron "Professor Louie" Hurwitz – producer, engineer
John Simon – producer
Chris Andersen – engineer
Steve Churchyard – engineer
John Roper – engineer

References

External links

1993 albums
Albums produced by John Simon (record producer)
Covers albums
Rhino Records albums
The Band albums